Günter Bust (12 July 1930 – 27 May 2005) was a German music educator and composer.

Life 
After the Bombing of Leipzig, the school was evacuated to Nossen in 1943/44. At the end of the war, he stayed in Zschopau.

Bust then worked as a teacher in Halberstadt and Dessau. Afterwards, he taught at the Käthe Kollwitz secondary school in Schönebeck.

He also presided over the youth symphony orchestra there. At the music school, he set up a secretariat for the "Georg Philipp Telemann" working group. This became the centre of Telemann care and research in 1985. Bust also installed a musical pre-school education. Furthermore, he made Magdeburg the venue for the chamber music competition of the GDR. In 1976, he created a composer class at the music school.

In 1978, he was involved in setting up the Magdeburg branch of the University of Music and Theatre Leipzig. From 1990 onwards, he was a lecturer at the Institute of Music at the Otto von Guericke University Magdeburg. He taught practical school playing, basso continuo and score playing.

Bust was violist of the König String Quartet Magdeburg. He also played in the Magdeburg Chamber Orchestra and the Academic Orchestra of Otto von Guericke University Magdeburg, which he conducted from 1997 to 2001. He was also active as an arranger and composer.

In 2005 he was awarded the Telemann-Pokal of the Telemann-Arbeitskreis.

Bust died in Schönebeck at the age of 74.

Further reading 
 Kerstin Hansen: Bust, Günter. In Online-Portal Musikkoffer Sachsen-Anhalt

References

External links 
 
 

German music educators
German choral conductors
German music arrangers
20th-century German composers
20th-century classical composers
German violists
1930 births
2005 deaths
Musicians from Magdeburg
20th-century violists